Juan de Saavedra was a soldier in the command of Diego de Almagro. In the first expedition to Chile in 1535, Almagro sent Saavedra to reconnoiter the coast of Chile in the ship that had brought reinforcements from Peru. Saavedra sailed as far as Alimapu, which he named Valparaíso after the town of his birth in Spain.

On his return from this expedition, Hernando Pizarro attempted to enlist him in the Peruvian civil war, but Saavedra chose not to take sides. When he learned that Cristóbal Vaca de Castro had arrived in Peru as royal governor with full powers, he joined him. He distinguished himself at the Battle of Chupas on 16 September 1542. He had three sons.

References

External links
 (Archived 2009-10-31) at Encarta

Viceroys of Peru
16th-century Peruvian people
16th-century Chilean people
1554 deaths
People from the Province of Cuenca
Year of birth unknown